The 2009 Florida State Seminoles football team represented Florida State University during the 2009 NCAA Division I FBS football season. The team played their home games at Doak Campbell Stadium in Tallahassee, Florida. They were members of the Atlantic Coast Conference ACC).

Head coach Bobby Bowden retired at the end of the 2009 season after 34 seasons at the helm for Florida State and 33 consecutive winning seasons. Offensive coordinator Jimbo Fisher was named his successor.

Previous season
Florida State entered the 2009 season coming off a 2008 season that ended with a 9–4 record (5–3 in the Atlantic Coast Conference) and a Champs Sports Bowl victory over Wisconsin. Florida State also won a share of the ACC Atlantic Division, but due to the head-to-head record versus Boston College, the Eagles represented the Atlantic Division in the Championship Game held in Tampa.

Rankings

Schedule

Recruits

Game capsules

Miami
Pregame line: FSU −4

Miami's defense stops Florida St. to back up Harris' final TD drive

Jacksonville State
Pregame line: Lines are not released when an FCS team plays an FBS team.
Florida State steals win from lower-division Jacksonville State

#9 BYU
Pregame line: BYU −6.5

Ponder drives Seminoles to decisive win over No. 7 Cougars

South Florida
Pregame line: FSU −12

Daniels steps in for injured Grothe, lifts USF to first ever win over FSU.

Boston College
Pregame line: FSU −5

BC blows 18-point lead, barely holds off FSU.

#23 Georgia Tech
Pregame line: FSU −2.5

 Nesbitt, Yellow Jackets hand third straight loss to Bowden's Seminoles.

North Carolina
Pregame line: UNC −2.5

Ponder rallies Seminoles from deficit to knock off North Carolina.

NC State
Pregame line: FSU −7

Florida St. edges NC State late in barnburner

Clemson
Pregame line: Clemson −8

Spiller rushes for 165 yards, touchdown as Clemson routs Florida St.
FSU starting quarterback Christian Ponder was injured in the 4th quarter and had to leave the game. His injury required surgery and he did not return to participation until the teams non-contact drills in the spring of 2010.
Redshirt Freshman E.J. Manuel took over for the injured Ponder, getting his first start the following week against Wake Forest.

Wake Forest
Pregame line: Wake −5

Thomas, Manuel help Florida State roll past Wake

Maryland
Pregame line: FSU −17

Florida State edges Maryland on last-minute TD to become bowl eligible

#1 Florida
Pregame line: Florida −21

Tebow accounts for five TDs in final home game as a Gator

Gator Bowl vs. #16 West Virginia
Pregame line: WVU −3

 The final game for Bobby Bowden, Mickey Andrews and Chuck Amato.
Bowden goes out a winner as Seminoles dispatch Mountaineers

Statistics

Team

Scores by quarter
Updated after the November 21st, 2009 Maryland game.

Offense

Passing

Rushing

Receiving

Defense

Special teams

Projected 2009 depth chart
Offensive
QB – Christian Ponder Jr
TB – Jermaine Thomas So
FB – Marcus Sims Sr
WR – Corey Surrency Sr
WR – Taiwan Easterling So
TE – Caz Piurowski Sr
LT – Evan Bellamy So
LG – Rodney Hudson Jr
C  – Ryan McMahon Jr
RG – David Spurlock So
RT – Zebrie Sanders So

Defense
DE – Kevin McNeil Sr
DE – Markus White Jr
DT – Kendrick Stewart Sr
DT – Budd Thacker Sr
LB – Dekoda Watson Sr
LB – Nigel Bradham So
LB – Kendall Smith Jr
CB – Ochuko Jenije Jr
CB – Patrick Robinson Sr
S  – Jamie Robinson Sr
S  – Korey Mangum Sr

Special Teams
K – Dustin Hopkins
P – Shawn Powell

References

Florida State
Florida State Seminoles football seasons
Gator Bowl champion seasons
Florida State Seminoles football